A mine countermeasures vessel or MCMV is a type of naval ship designed for the location of and destruction of naval mines which combines the role of a minesweeper and minehunter in one hull. The term MCMV is also applied collectively to minehunters and minesweepers.

References